The 2018 Cal Poly Mustangs football team represented California Polytechnic State University in the 2018 NCAA Division I FCS football season. The Mustangs were led by tenth-year head coach Tim Walsh and played their home games at Alex G. Spanos Stadium. They were members of the Big Sky Conference. They finished the season 5–6, 4–4 in Big Sky play to finish in a tie for sixth place.

Previous season
The Mustangs finished the 2017 season 1–10, 1–7 in Big Sky play to finish in 12th place.

Preseason

Polls
On July 16, 2018 during the Big Sky Kickoff in Spokane, Washington, the Mustangs were predicted to finish in tenth place in the coaches poll and eleventh place in the media poll.

Preseason All-Conference Team
The Mustangs had one player selected to the Preseason All-Conference Team.

Joe Protheroe – Sr. FB

Schedule

Despite also being a member of the Big Sky, the game vs. Weber State will be a non-conference game and will have no effect on the Big Sky standings.

Game summaries

at North Dakota State

Weber State

Brown

at Eastern Washington

Montana

at Sacramento State

UC Davis

at Northern Arizona

at Montana State

at Idaho State

Southern Utah

References

Cal Poly
Cal Poly Mustangs football seasons
Cal Poly Mustangs football